The Abierto National Copa Antioquia was an annual golf tournament held in Medellín, Colombia. It was founded in 2009 and formed part of the Latin America based Tour de las Américas.

It became an event on both the second tier European Challenge Tour and the Canadian Tour schedules in 2010.

Winners

Notes

External links
Coverage on the Challenge Tour's official site
Coverage on the Tour de las Américas' official site
Coverage on the Canadian Tour's official site

Tour de las Américas events
Former Challenge Tour events
Former PGA Tour Canada events
Golf tournaments in Colombia